Laxmikhar is a small village in the state of Maharashtra, India. It is located approximately 20 km from the town of Roha.

Villages in Raigad district